John Major was the member of parliament for Southampton, England, during 1628.

References

 

English MPs 1628–1629